For other localities with the same name, see Tsaratanana (disambiguation)
 

Tsaratanana is a district of Betsiboka in Madagascar.

Communes
The district is further divided into ten communes:

 Ambakireny
 Andriamena
 Bekapaika
 Betrandraka
 Brieville
 Keliloha
 Manakana
 Sarobaratra
 Tsararova
 Tsaratanana

References 

Districts of Betsiboka